Clayton Lake is an unincorporated village in Aroostook County, Maine, United States. The community is located within the Northwest Aroostook unorganized territory, specifically T11 R14,  on the north shore of its eponymous lake within the North Maine Woods in southwestern Aroostook County.

Clayton Lake has been a logging camp since the 1920s. It is periodically used as a base of operations as needs arise such as fighting forest fires.

The village had a post office until 2008 when the community post office was discontinued.  The post office had the distinction of being the only post office in the country where mail going to another point in Maine had to pass through two other states as well as Canada.  Mail for Clayton Lake was serviced by the post office in Portland, who sent the mail via truck to Boston, then by plane to Montreal and then by train to Lac de la Frontiere, Quebec, before being delivered to Clayton Lake.

Clayton Lake
Clayton Lake is a lake located immediately south of Clayton Lake Village. The lake contains several species of fish, including landlocked salmon, brook trout and rainbow smelt.

Transportation
Clayton Lake is only accessible via private roads within the North Maine Woods.  There is a private turf landing strip located north of Clayton Lake.

Climate 
Like the rest of Maine the climate is warm-summer humid continental (Köppen: Dfb) bordering on a subarctic climate (Dfc), with cold and very snowy winters, and pleasant summers on a few occasions being hot.

References

Villages in Aroostook County, Maine
North Maine Woods
Villages in Maine